Herbert Hoos (born 18 July 1965) is a retired German football player. He spent seven seasons in the Bundesliga with 1. FC Kaiserslautern.

Honours
 DFB-Pokal winner: 1989–90

References

External links
 

1965 births
Living people
German footballers
Germany under-21 international footballers
1. FC Kaiserslautern players
Rot-Weiss Frankfurt players
Bundesliga players
Association football midfielders